Charles Beach Hawley (Brookfield, Connecticut, February 14, 1858 – Eatontown, New Jersey, December 29, 1915) was an American bass, voice teacher, organist and composer of art songs and other vocal works.

Biography
Charles Beach was born to John N. and Clarissa W. Keeler Hawley in Brookfield, Connecticut.  Charles and his father were descendants of the pioneer founders of Newtown, which later became part of Brookfield.  For many years, his father was the organist at St. Paul's Church in Brookfield.

As a young man he attended the Cheshire Military School, where he "took prominent part in all the musical activities of the school".  In 1875, he moved to New York City, where he studied singing with George J. Webb, P.A. Rivarde, and Gustave Federlein, and composition with Dudley Buck.  He soon began singing at Calvary Episcopal Church, and later became an assistant organist at St. Thomas Church.  He married Hattie B. Crane in 1889.

He established himself as a versatile musician in New York.  He was bass singer and choir director at the Broadway Tabernacle for 17 years.  He had a private studio as a voice teacher and ran The Metropolitan College of Music for 10 years.  He was a Charter Member of the Manuscript Society and was an active member of the Mendelssohn Glee Club.  Later organist and choir director positions were at the Madison Avenue Methodist Episcopal Church and West End Presbyterian Church.

Music
As a composer, C. B. Hawley concentrated on secular and sacred art songs, publishing at least 50 songs.  He also composed a Christmas cantata, The Christ Child, esteemed in its day, and several part-songs for the Mendelssohn Glee Club.

His musical language is "simple and lyrical" at times, with more dramatic passages when indicated by the text.  Songs such as "Noon and Night" and "The Sweetest Flower That Blows" are especially good for young or beginning singers.  Most were published by G. Schirmer between 1895 and 1915.

At least one of his works remained in the repertoire after his death: the song "Because I Love You, Dear" was heard on a WABC radio broadcast on December 10, 1934, with Andre Kostelanetz conducting.

Musical compositions
All published by G. Schirmer unless noted; texts are by the composer unless noted.

Larger works
The Christ Child, Christmas cantata for SATB soloists, SATB choir and organ

Secular songs for voice and piano
Ah! 'Tis a Dream, ©1887
(The) Arrow and the Song (Henry Wadsworth Longfellow), William A. Pond, ©1893
Because I Love You, Dear,  ©1894
Bedouin Love Song
For Love of Thee
Greeting (Frank Lebby Stanton), ©1898
Hushaby, Sweet My Own (Eugene Field) 
I Love You So (Alice Dunbar), John Church publisher
In April
The Joy of Spring (Kate Chopin), John Church, ©1913
A June Madrigal
Katherine's Curls
Lady Mine
(The) Land of Nod
My Little Love, ©1890
(The) Nightingale and the Rose (R. H. Beck),  ©1898
Noon and Night (Herbert Trench), John Church/T. Presser, ©1905
O Haste Thee, Sweet
Once Again
A Question (Richard Watson Gilder)
Rainbows
The Ring
A Rose Fable
A Song of Seasons
(The) Song that my Heart is Singing
Spring's Awakening
(The) Sweetest Flower That Blows (Frederic Peterson), John Church publisher, ©1898
Sweetheart
Three Songs with piano accompaniment, ©1894
Good-Night (S. Weir Mitchell)
Unknown
Unknown
Two Eyes of Brown
When Life Hath Sorrow Found (Charles Swain), William A. Pond, ©1894
When Love is Gone, ©1894
Where Love Doth Build His Nest
Woodland Love Song (Eunice Tietjens), John Church publisher, ©1909

Sacred songs for voice and piano or organ
Angels Roll the Rock Away (Easter Song)
Breathe Your Soft Prayer to Christ the Child (anonymous text from The New York Sun newspaper), John Church publisher, ©1910
Calm on the listening ear of night (Christmas song), John Church publisher, ©1905
The Christ Child
Come Unto Me, ©1895 
I Heard the Voice of Jesus Say (D. Bonar), John Church publisher, ©1910
Oh, for a closer walk with God (W. Cowper), John Church publisher, ©1913
Redeeming Love

Footnotes

References

 

1858 births
1915 deaths
People from Brookfield, Connecticut
Musicians from Connecticut
20th-century American composers